Choong Tan Fook  (born 6 February 1976) is a former badminton player from Malaysia. Choong is currently coaching the Hong Kong badminton team.

Career overview 
Choong made his debut in Olympic Games in 2000 Sydney. Partnered with Lee Wan Wah, they advance to the semi finals stage, but lost to South Korean pair Lee Dong-soo and Yoo Yong-sung in the rubber game. The duo played in the bronze medal match against another South Korean Ha Tae-kwon and Kim Dong-moon, but lost in straight game with the score 2–15, 8–15.

In 2004 Athens, Choong and Lee had a bye in the first round and defeated Pramote Teerawiwatana and Tesana Panvisvas of Thailand in the second. In the quarterfinals, they lost to Lee Dong-soo & Yoo Yong-sung of South Korea 11–15, 15–11, 15–9.

In 2008 Beijing, Choong and Lee competed as the fourth seeded, however they lost to eventual bronze medalist from South Korea Lee Jae-jin and Hwang Ji-man in the first round with the score 22–20, 13–21, 16–21.

Choong played in the 2008 Thomas Cup series (men's world team championship) for the Malaysian team. In the quarter-final, where Malaysia faced Japan, Choong paired with Koo Kien Keat to defeat Shuichi Sakamoto and Shintaro Ikeda 21–13, 21–11. However, due to illness Choong could not take part in the semi-final showdown against defending champion China which Malaysia narrowly lost 2–3.

After a six-year relationship with China's doubles star Zhang Jiewen, Choong and Zhang were married in January 2010. The wedding reception was celebrated on 1 May 2010 in Genting Highlands. They plan to take a honeymoon in Paris, where the 2010 Badminton World Championships will be held. They have two children together.

Achievements

World Championships 
Men's doubles

World Cup 
Men's doubles

Asian Championships 
Men's doubles

Southeast Asian Games 
Men's doubles

Commonwealth Games 
Men's doubles

BWF Super Series and BWF Grand Prix 
Men's doubles

  BWF Superseries tournament
 Grand Prix Gold Tournament
 Grand Prix Tournament
 IBF World Grand Prix tournament

Honour
  :
 Member of the Order of the Defender of the Realm (A.M.N.) (2000)

References

External links
 
 
 
 

1976 births
Living people
People from Perak
Malaysian sportspeople of Chinese descent
Malaysian male badminton players
Badminton players at the 2000 Summer Olympics
Badminton players at the 2004 Summer Olympics
Badminton players at the 2008 Summer Olympics
Olympic badminton players of Malaysia
Badminton players at the 2002 Asian Games
Asian Games bronze medalists for Malaysia
Asian Games medalists in badminton
Medalists at the 2002 Asian Games
Badminton players at the 1998 Commonwealth Games
Badminton players at the 2002 Commonwealth Games
Badminton players at the 2006 Commonwealth Games
Commonwealth Games gold medallists for Malaysia
Commonwealth Games silver medallists for Malaysia
Commonwealth Games medallists in badminton
Competitors at the 1999 Southeast Asian Games
Competitors at the 2001 Southeast Asian Games
Competitors at the 2003 Southeast Asian Games
Competitors at the 2005 Southeast Asian Games
Southeast Asian Games gold medalists for Malaysia
Southeast Asian Games silver medalists for Malaysia
Southeast Asian Games bronze medalists for Malaysia
Southeast Asian Games medalists in badminton
World No. 1 badminton players
Members of the Order of the Defender of the Realm
Medallists at the 1998 Commonwealth Games
Medallists at the 2002 Commonwealth Games
Medallists at the 2006 Commonwealth Games